"Saturday Night" is the third single from English rock band Suede's third studio album, Coming Up (1996), released on 13 January 1997 through Nude Records. The single continued the success of Suede's previous two hits by entering the top 10 of the UK Singles Chart, peaking at number six. Outside the UK, the song peaked at number one in Iceland, number seven in Finland, number eight in Denmark, and number 11 in Sweden.

Critical reception
A reviewer from Music Week rated the song three out of five, adding, "Evoking the melody of Elton John's Song For Guy, this slowie lacks the anthemic quality of many of their previous ballads, but fans will buy for the bonus tracks."

Music video
The accompanying music video for the song was directed by Pedro Romhanyi, who previously made videos for the band's songs, "Animal Nitrate", and "Beautiful Ones". The clip stars British actress Keeley Hawes. It was shot in the London Underground at a disused Piccadilly line platform at Aldwych station. Aldwych station is notable as the only platform in London's underground network where filming is allowed.

Track listings
All songs were written by Brett Anderson and Richard Oakes except where noted.

UK CD1
 "Saturday Night"
 "W.S.D." 
 "Jumble Sale Mums"

UK CD2
 "Saturday Night"
 "This Time"
 "Saturday Night" (original demo)

UK cassette single
 "Saturday Night"
 "Picnic by the Motorway" (live)

European CD single
 "Saturday Night" – 4:34
 "This Time" – 5:46

Japanese CD single
 "Saturday Night"
 "W.S.D." 
 "Jumble Sale Mums"
 "This Time"
 "Saturday Night" (original demo)

Charts

Weekly charts

Year-end charts

References

Suede (band) songs
1996 songs
1997 singles
Music videos directed by Pedro Romhanyi
Number-one singles in Iceland
Song recordings produced by Ed Buller
Songs written by Brett Anderson
Songs written by Richard Oakes (guitarist)
Songs about nights